The Nexus Mustang is a two place homebuilt aircraft designed around the construction techniques of the Midget Mustang.

Design and development
Designer Dick Eaves used his experience building a Baby Ace, Skyhopper II, Wittman Tailwinds, Wag-Aero CUBys, and a Midget Mustang to develop a new two seat tandem homebuilt design.

The aircraft uses an all-aluminum construction with fiberglass nose cowling. The tail surfaces and spar extrusion are modeled after a Mustang II.

Operational history
A Nexus Mustang won first place in the Plans built Category at Sun 'n Fun in 2004 and Bronze Lindy at EAA AirVenture 2004.

Specifications (Nexus Mustang)

References

Homebuilt aircraft
Single-engined tractor aircraft
Low-wing aircraft
2000s Canadian sport aircraft
Aircraft manufactured in Canada